The 1973 Milwaukee Panthers football team represented the University of Wisconsin–Milwaukee as an independent the 1973 NCAA Division II football season. Led by first-year head coach Glenn Brady, Milwaukee compiled a record of 6–4–1. The Panthers offense scored 251 points while the defense allowed 218 points.

Schedule

References

Milwaukee
Milwaukee Panthers football seasons
Milwaukee Panthers football